George M. von Furstenberg is a noted economist, currently serving as the James H. Rudy Professor of Economics at Indiana University and best known for his work in the areas of monetary policy, free trade policy and international finance.

Early life and education
Von Furstenberg was born during Second World War. From 1955-1958, Von Furstenberg was educated at The Oratory School, a Roman Catholic boarding independent school for boys in the village of Woodcote in Oxfordshire in Southern England. He emigrated to America in his late teens, doing his undergraduate work at Columbia University, and graduating in magna cum laude in 1963. From there, he went on to a doctorate in International Finance at Princeton University, with an internship at the Brookings Institution as a pre-doctoral fellow.

Life and career
Von Furstenberg served for a year as an assistant professor of economics at Cornell, followed by another stint at Brookings, this time as an Economic Policy Fellow assigned to the Program Evaluation Section of the Department of Housing and Urban Development (HUD).  He returned to Cornell for two years as an assistant professor, then spent a summer as a consultant to HUD, before moving to Indiana as an associate professor.  Following a stint as a visiting professor at the University of Augsburg, he became a full professor at Indiana, in 1973.

From 1973-1976 von Furstenberg served as Senior Staff Economist for the U.S. President's Council of Economic Advisors.  He spent half a year as a resident economist at the American Enterprise Institute, then resumed his teaching duties in Bloomington.  In 1978, he began a five-year stint as Chief of the Financial Studies Division of the International Monetary Fund.
In 1983, he was named Rudy Professor of Economics.

While continuing to lecture at Indiana University, von Furstenberg has also made time for brief visiting professorships Justus-Liebig University and the University of Toronto and summer lectures at University of Szczecin, the Warsaw University School of Management International Business Program, and Catholic University of Lublin Business School.  He has been the recipient of numerous Fulbright and other grants, and has consulted for several U.S. government agencies as well as the Deutsche Bundesbank.

From 2000-2002, von Furstenberg was the inaugural Robert Bendheim Professor of Economic and Fiscal Policy at the Fordham Graduate School of Business.

The professor is married and has one son.  He speaks German and English fluently, has a working knowledge of French and some knowledge of Latin and Spanish.  His wife speaks Dutch, German and French.

Works

Articles and papers

Working papers
George M. von Furstenberg & B. Hofer, 1997. "Financial Integration in North America and in Europe Among Neighboring Countries at Different Stages of Development," Papers 25, American Institute for Contemporary German Studies.
 Burton G. Malkiel & George M. von Furstenberg & Harry S. Watson, 1980. "Expectations, Tobins q, and Industry Investment," NBER Reprints 0054, National Bureau of Economic Research, Inc.

Articles
George M. von Furstenberg & Carlos B. Tabora, 2004. "Bolsa or NYSE: price discovery for Mexican shares," Journal of International Financial Markets, Institutions and Money, Elsevier, vol. 14(4), pp. 295–311.
George M. von Furstenberg & Jianjun Wei, 2002. "The Chinese crux of monetary union in East Asia," Paper to be delivered at a G8 Research Group Conference Calgary, June 22, 2002.
George M. von Furstenberg 2001. "Hopes and delusions of transparency1," The North American Journal of Economics and Finance, Elsevier, vol. 12(1), pp. 105–120.
George M. von Furstenberg, 2001. "Pressures for currency consolidation in insurance and finance: Are the currencies of financially small countries on the endangered list?," Journal of Policy Modeling, Elsevier, vol. 23(3), pp. 321–331.
George M. von Furstenberg, 2000. "Implications of changes in transparency in civilian and military spheres," Paper prepared for the symposium, The Kyushu-Okinawa Summit: The Challenges and Opportunities for the Developing World in the 21st Century, Tokyo, Japan, July 17, 2000.
Alexander, Volbert & George M. von Furstenberg, 2000. "Monetary unions--a superior alternative to full dollarization in the long run," The North American Journal of Economics and Finance, Elsevier, vol. 11(2), pp. 205–225.
"A Case Against U.S. Dollarization," Challenge: The Magazine of Economic Affairs, July/August 2000, pp. 108–121.
George M. von Furstenberg, 1998. "Price Stability: How Canada's Governor Crow Approached It," Journal of Policy Modeling, Elsevier, vol. 20(3), pp. 335–360
von Furstenberg, George M. & Fratianni, Michele, 1996. "Indicators of financial development," The North American Journal of Economics and Finance, Elsevier, vol. 7(1), pages 19–29. [Downloadable!]
George M. von Furstenberg & Joseph P. Daniels, 1992. "Can you trust G-7 promises?," International Economic Insights 3 September/October 1992, pp. 24–27.

Books 
Learning from the World's Best Central Bankers: Principles and Policies for Subduing Inflation, George M. von Furstenberg and Michael K. Ulan. Dordrecht NL: Kluwer Academic Publishers, 1998. With Foreword by Burton G. Malkiel. 
Monetary Unions and Hard Pegs: Effects on Trade, Financial Development, and Stability, V. Alexander, J. Mélitz, and G. M. von Furstenberg, eds., Oxford University Press, 2004. Foreword by Robert A. Mundell.

References

External links
Academic homepage

American economists
Columbia University School of General Studies alumni
German economists
Indiana University faculty
Academic staff of the John Paul II Catholic University of Lublin
People educated at The Oratory School
Academic staff of the University of Giessen
Academic staff of the University of Toronto
Academic staff of the University of Szczecin
Academic staff of the University of Warsaw
Living people
Year of birth missing (living people)